Canton Township is a township in Kingman County, Kansas, United States.  As of the 2000 census, its population was 118.

Geography
Canton Township covers an area of 36.3 square miles (94.01 square kilometers); of this, 0.01 square miles (0.04 square kilometers) or 0.04 percent is water. The streams of Big Spring Creek, Blue Stem Creek and Duck Creek run through this township.

Unincorporated towns
 Adams
(This list is based on USGS data and may include former settlements.)

Adjacent townships
 Eagle Township (north)
 Allen Township (northeast)
 Bennett Township (east)
 Township 6, Harper County (south)
 Valley Township (west)
 Richland Township (northwest)

Major highways
 K-42 (Kansas highway)

References
 U.S. Board on Geographic Names (GNIS)
 United States Census Bureau cartographic boundary files

External links
 US-Counties.com
 City-Data.com

Townships in Kingman County, Kansas
Townships in Kansas